Shoutout! is a Philippine teen music reality variety show broadcast by ABS-CBN. It aired from November 29, 2010 to February 11, 2011, and is hosted by the network's leading stars that include Erich Gonzales, Enchong Dee, Robi Domingo, Sam Concepcion, Arron Villaflor, and Empress Schuck. Joining the hosts are daily teen performers that alternate every week. At the end of the week, all performers collaborate on a Friday all-star cast called TGIF.

Main hosts

Erich Gonzales
Enchong Dee
Robi Domingo
Sam Concepcion
Empress Schuck
Arron Villaflor
Enrique Gil (Season 1)

The first season ran for eight weeks from November 29, 2010 to January 21, 2011. In the first six weeks, it was shown as a pre-program for the Primetime Bida block for forty-five minutes.

Aside from performances, Shoutout! also featured different segments, including games involving audience members and a segment featuring fan arts made by fans.

Mondeerrifics
Ryan Bang
Jenny Kim
Julia Montes
Makisig Morales
Rhap Salazar
Ann Li
Tippy Dos Santos
Aria Clemente
Patrick Sugui 
Mica Roy Torre

Tuesdelicious
James Reid
Joe Vargas
Devon Seron
James Torres
Kyle Alandy Amor
Mica Caldito 
Auriette Divina
Emmanuelle Vera
Inno Martin 
Piero Vergara

Miyerkulitz
Kathryn Bernardo
Bret Jackson
Fretzie Bercede
Jane Oineza
Miles Ocampo
Mikylla Ramirez
John Manalo
Kiray Celis
Paul Salas
Sue Ramirez

Friends-Thurs
Ivan Dorschner
Nel Gomez
Tricia Santos
Young JV
Jaco Benin
Thara Jordana
Yen Santos
Benjamin de Guzman
Bianca Casado
Linn Oeymo
Hannah Flores

Guests
Neil Coleta (December 13–17, 2010)

Shoutout!: Level Up
On January 21, 2011, in a taped episode, the teens were feared cancellation in a month's time if no improvement to the show is continued.  The show re-formatted with a more reality format. The previous teen groups: Monderrifics, Tuesdelicious, Miyerkulitz, and Friends-Thurs were abolished and instead three new groupings were introduced. In addition, Enrique was demoted from being a main host to being part of the regular teenmates.

Each member of a group would have to audition for the production number of their respective days. If they pass the audition, they will get to perform for their group. Team Coolelats (A) perform on Mondays, Team Overload (B) on Tuesdays, and Team Up (C) on Wednesdays. On the next two weeks of the show, the spot performances were shown in 1 day, and the group performances in another day. In its last week, the Wednesday and Thursday episodes were dedicated to the teenmates who only had one chance or no chance to perform at all.

Shoutout! was canceled a week earlier than expected to make way for new programming such as The Price Is Right.

Team For The Win (FTW)
The team has decided to rename the team from "Coolelats" to "For The Win"

Kathryn Bernardo, John Manalo and Julia Montes left the show in the second week of Level Up due to conflicts with their Mara Clara taping.

Team Overload

Joe Vargas left the show in the second week of Level Up due to taping conflicts with Mutya.

Team Up

Yen Santos and Piero Vergara left the show in the second week of Level Up due to taping conflicts with Mutya. Ryan Bang left the show as well due to his numerous shows. Jenny Kim likewise left the show to focus on her studies.

See also
List of programs aired by ABS-CBN
List of programs broadcast by ABS-CBN

References

External links
Official website

Shoutout : A proximity social network

ABS-CBN original programming
Philippine variety television shows
2010 Philippine television series debuts
2011 Philippine television series endings
Filipino-language television shows